Robert William Windsor (born 31 January 1948 in Newport, Monmouthshire), known as Bobby and nicknamed "The Duke", is a former rugby union player who gained 28 rugby union caps for Wales as a hooker between 1973 and 1979. Windsor published his autobiography in October 2010 entitled 'The Iron Duke'.

Early career 

A steelworker by trade, Windsor actually began his rugby union career as a back, playing at fullback and fly-half, but became famous as a hooker. He played for Brynglas and Cross Keys before joining Pontypool where with Graham Price and Charlie Faulkner he became part of the legendary Pontypool Front Row, also known as the Viet Gwent (a play on Viet Cong) and immortalised in song by Max Boyce.

Wales 

Windsor made his debut for Wales against Australia in Cardiff in 1973, a match Wales won by 24 points to nil with Windsor scoring a hooker's try, and took over from Jeff Young as first-choice hooker. The Pontypool front row played for Wales as a unit 19 times during the 1970s, and were on the losing side in only four of those matches. He played his last international match against France in February 1979.

British Lion 

Windsor was selected for two British Lions tours. He played in all the tests on the tour of South Africa in 1974, and helped the Lions forwards dominate the Springboks. On the later tour of New Zealand in 1977 he played only in the first test and did not recapture his form in South Africa.

References

External links 
 Bobby Windsor at sporting heroes

1948 births
Living people
British & Irish Lions rugby union players from Wales
Cross Keys RFC players
Rugby union players from Newport, Wales
Pontypool RFC players
Rugby union hookers
Wales international rugby union players
Welsh rugby union players